Groundhog Day is a holiday celebrated on February 2 in the United States and Canada.

Groundhog Day may also refer to:
"Groundhog Day", a song by Melanie Safka from her 1976 album Photograph
Groundhog Day (film)
Groundhog Day (musical), a 2016 musical based on the film
"The Groundhog Day", an episode of The O.C.
"Groundhog Day", a song by Eminem from the deluxe edition of The Marshall Mathers LP2
"Groundhog Day", a song by Drag-On from Opposite of H2O

See also 
Groundhog (disambiguation)